This page details the records, statistics, and career achievements of American professional basketball player Stephen Curry. Curry is a point guard for the Golden State Warriors of the National Basketball Association (NBA). He previously played collegiately for Davidson. As the holder of numerous records, particularly in three-point shooting, Curry is widely regarded as one of the greatest players of all time. Curry has played 13 seasons in the NBA, where he is a nine-time All-Star, two-time Most Valuable Player, All-Star Game MVP, Finals MVP, Western Conference Finals MVP, and a four-time NBA champion with the Warriors in 2015, 2017, 2018, and 2022.

Career statistics

Regular season 

|-
| style="text-align:left;"|
| style="text-align:left;"|Golden State
| 80 || 77 || 36.2 || .462 || .437 || .885 || 4.5 || 5.9 || 1.9 || .2 || 17.5
|-
| style="text-align:left;"|
| style="text-align:left;"|Golden State
| 74 || 74 || 33.6 || .480 || .442 || style="background:#cfecec;"|.934* || 3.9 || 5.8 || 1.5 || .3 || 18.6
|-
| style="text-align:left;"|
| style="text-align:left;"|Golden State
| 26 || 23 || 28.2 || .490 || .455 || .809 || 3.4 || 5.3 || 1.5 || .3 || 14.7
|-
| style="text-align:left;"|
| style="text-align:left;"|Golden State
| 78 || 78 || 38.2 || .451 || .453 || .900 || 4.0 || 6.9 || 1.6 || .2 || 22.9
|-
| style="text-align:left;"|
| style="text-align:left;"|Golden State
| 78 || 78 || 36.5 || .471 || .424 || .885 || 4.3 || 8.5 || 1.6 || .2 || 24.0
|-
| style="text-align:left; background:#afe6ba;"|†
| style="text-align:left;"|Golden State
| 80 || 80 || 32.7 || .487 || .443 || style="background:#cfecec;"|.914* || 4.3 || 7.7 || 2.0 || .2 || 23.8
|-
| style="text-align:left;"|
| style="text-align:left;"|Golden State
| 79 || 79 || 34.2 || .504 || .454 || style="background:#cfecec;"|.908* || 5.4 || 6.7 || style="background:#cfecec;"|2.1* || .2 || style="background:#cfecec;"|30.1*
|-
| style="text-align:left; background:#afe6ba;"|†
| style="text-align:left;"|Golden State
| 79 || 79 || 33.4 || .468 || .411 || .898 || 4.5 || 6.6 || 1.8 || .2 || 25.3
|-
| style="text-align:left; background:#afe6ba;"|†
| style="text-align:left;"| Golden State
| 51 || 51 || 32.0 || .495 || .423 || style="background:#cfecec;"|.921* || 5.1 || 6.1 || 1.6 || .2 || 26.4
|-
| style="text-align:left;"|
| style="text-align:left;"|Golden State
| 69 || 69 || 33.8 || .472 || .437 || .916 || 5.3 || 5.2 || 1.3 || .4 || 27.3
|-
| style="text-align:left;"|
| style="text-align:left;"|Golden State
| 5 || 5 || 27.8 || .402 || .245 || 1.000 || 5.2 || 6.6 || 1.0 || .4 || 20.8
|-
| style="text-align:left;"|
| style="text-align:left;"|Golden State
| 63 || 63 || 34.2 || .482 || .421 || .916 || 5.5 || 5.8 || 1.2 || .1 || style="background:#cfecec;"| 32.0*
|-
| style="text-align:left; background:#afe6ba;"|†
| style="text-align:left;"|Golden State
| 64 || 64 || 34.5 || .437 || .380 || .923 || 5.2 || 6.3 || 1.3 || .4 || 25.5
|- class="sortbottom"
| style="text-align:center;" colspan="2"|Career
| 826 || 820 || 34.3 || .473 || .428 || style="background:#e0cef2;"|.908 || 4.6 || 6.5 || 1.7 || .2 || 24.3
|- class="sortbottom"
| style="text-align:center;" colspan="2"|All-Star
| 8 || 8 || 27.0 || .433 || .405 || 1.000 || 5.6 || 5.8 || 1.4 || .3 || 22.5

Playoffs 

|-
| style="text-align:left;"|2013
| style="text-align:left;"|Golden State
| 12 || 12 || 41.4 || .434 || .396 || .921 || 3.8 || 8.1 || 1.7 || 0.2 || 23.4
|-
| style="text-align:left;"|2014
| style="text-align:left;"|Golden State
| 7 || 7 || 42.3 || .440 || .386 || .881 || 3.6 || 8.4 || 1.7 || 0.1 || 23.0
|-
| style="text-align:left; background:#afe6ba;"|2015†
| style="text-align:left;"|Golden State
| 21 || 21 || 39.3 || .456 || .422 || .835 || 5.0 || 6.4 || 1.9 || 0.1 || 28.3
|-
| style="text-align:left;"|2016
| style="text-align:left;"|Golden State
| 18 || 17 || 34.3 || .438 || .404 || .916 || 5.5 || 5.2 || 1.4 || 0.3 || 25.1
|-
| style="text-align:left; background:#afe6ba;"|2017†
| style="text-align:left;"|Golden State
| 17 || 17 || 35.3 || .484 || .419 || .904 || 6.2 || 6.7 || 2.0 || 0.2 || 28.1
|-
| style="text-align:left; background:#afe6ba;"|2018†
| style="text-align:left;"|Golden State
| 15 || 14 || 37.0 || .451 || .395 || .957 || 6.1 || 5.4 || 1.7 || 0.7 || 25.5
|-
| style="text-align:left;"|2019
| style="text-align:left;"|Golden State
| 22 || 22 || 38.5 || .441 || .377 || .943 || 6.0 || 5.7 || 1.1 || 0.2 || 28.2
|-
| style="text-align:left; background:#afe6ba;"|2022†
| style="text-align:left;"|Golden State
| 22 || 18 || 34.7 || .459 || .397 || .829 || 5.2 || 5.9 || 1.3 || 0.4 || 27.4
|- class="sortbottom"
| style="text-align:center;" colspan="2"|Career
| 134 || 128 || 37.3 || .452 || .401 || .892 || 5.4 || 6.2 || 1.6 || 0.3 || 26.6

Awards and honors

NBA 
 NBA Finals MVP: 2022
 NBA Western Conference Finals MVP: 2022
 2× NBA Most Valuable Player Award: , 
 The only unanimous MVP selection in league history (2016)
 NBA All-Star Game MVP: 
 NBA 75th Anniversary Team: 
 8× All-NBA selection:
 Third team: 
 NBA All-Rookie First Team: 
 NBA steals leader: 
 2× NBA scoring leader: , 
 2× NBA Three-Point Contest champion: , 
 NBA Skills Challenge champion: 
 NBA Sportsmanship Award: 
 NBA Community Assist Award: 
 NBA record for most three-point field goals made in history (3,346)
 NBA record for highest career free throw percentage (90.9%, minimum 1,200 attempts)
 NBA regular season record for made three-pointers (402)
 NBA record for most career three-point field goals made in playoffs (561)
 NBA record for most three-point field goals made in a single playoffs (98)
 Tied with Klay Thompson.
 NBA Finals record for most three-point field goals made (152)
 NBA Finals record for most three-point field goals made in a game (9)
 NBA record for most consecutive regular-season games with a made three-pointer (178)
 NBA record for most consecutive playoff games with a made three-pointer (132)
 NBA regular season record for most games with 10+ made three-pointers (23)
 NBA record for most points scored in an overtime period (17)
 Warriors franchise leader in points
 Warriors franchise leader in assists
 Warriors franchise leader in steals
 Warriors franchise leader in made field goals
 Warriors franchise leader in made three-point field goals
 Warriors franchise leader in free throw percentage
 Warriors franchise leader in points in playoffs
 Warriors franchise leader in assists in playoffs
 Warriors franchise leader in steals in playoffs
 Warriors franchise leader in three-pointers made in playoffs
 Warriors franchise record holder for triple-double as a rookie
 Led the Warriors to achieve the highest all-time regular season winning record in NBA history (73–9 – 89%)

College 

 2× SoCon Player of the Year (2008–2009)
 Consensus first-team All-American (2009)
 Consensus second-team All-American (2008)
 2× First-team All-SoCon (2008–2009)
 2× SoCon Conference Tournament Most Outstanding Player (2007–2008)
 3× SoCon first-team All-Tournament (2007–2009)
 SoCon Freshman of the Year (2007)
 SoCon All-Freshmen Team (2007)
No. 30 retired by Davidson Wildcats

College Records 
 NCAA Division I scoring leader (2009)
 Single-season NCAA 3-point field goals (162, 2007–08)
 Single-season NCAA freshman 3-point field goals (122, 2006–07)

Davidson College records 

 All-time leading scorer in Davidson College history (2,635)
 All-time Davidson College leader in 3-point field-goals made (414)
 All-time Davidson College leader in 30-point games (30)
 All-time Davidson College leader in 40-point games (6)
 Single-season Davidson College points (974, 2008–09)
 Single-season Davidson College steals (86, 2008–09)
 Single-season Davidson College freshman points (730, 2006–07)

United States National Team 
 FIBA World Cup gold medalist: 2010, 2014
 FIBA U19 World Championship silver medalist: 2007

Other 
 Laureus World Sportsman of the Year nominee (3): 2016–2017, 2023
 ESPY Award for Best Male Athlete: 2015
 ESPY Award for Best NBA Player (3): 2015, 2021–2022
 ESPY Award for Best Record-Breaking Performance (2): 2016, 2022
 ESPY Award for Best Breakthrough Athlete nominee: 2008
 BET Award for Sportsman of the Year (5): 2015–2017, 2019, 2022
 Jackie Robinson Sports Award: 2021
 Hickok Belt: 2015
 AP Male Athlete of the Year: 2015
 Sports Illustrated Sportsperson of the Year (2): 2018 (as a team), 2022
 FirstEnergy Foundation Ambassador of Golf Award: 2023
 Jefferson Award for Public Service: 2011
 Key to the City of Charlotte: 2022
 Academy Award for Best Documentary Short Film (as executive producer of The Queen of Basketball): 2022
 Teen Choice Award for Choice Male Athlete (3): 2015–2017
 People's Choice Award for the Game Changer nominee (2): 2019, 2022

NBA achievements

Regular season
 1st place all-time for three-pointers made in NBA history with 3,346.
 1st place all-time for three-pointers attempted in NBA history with 7,816.
 1st place all-time for most seasons leading the league in three-pointers made with 7.
 1st place all-time for most seasons leading the league in three-pointers attempted with 7.
 1st place all-time for three-pointers made in a season with 402.
 Highest career free throw percentage with 90.9% (minimum 1,200 attempts).
 Highest scoring average for a player who led the league in free throw percentage in the same season with 30.1.
 1st place all-time for most seasons with a 90+ free throw percentage with 10.
 Tied with Ray Allen.
 Largest increase in scoring average from previous season by a reigning MVP.
 1st place all-time for consecutive games with at least 1 three-pointer made in a season with 79.
 1st place all-time for games with at least 2 three-pointers made and 2 assists with 712.
 1st place all-time for games with at least 3 three-pointers made and 3 assists with 546.
 1st place all-time for games with at least 4 three-pointers made and 4 assists with 373.
 1st place all-time for games with at least 5 three-pointers made and 5 assists with 229.
 1st place all-time for games with at least 6 three-pointers made with 6 assists with 115.
 1st place all-time for games with at least 7 three-pointers made with 7 assists with 47.
 1st place all-time for games with at least 8 three-pointers made with 8 assists with 25.
 1st place all-time for games with at least 9 three-pointers made with 9 assists with 5.
 1st place all-time for consecutive games with at least 1 three-pointer made with 233.
 1st place all-time for consecutive games with at least 2 three-pointers made with 53.
 1st place all-time for consecutive games with at least 3 three-pointers made with 24.
 1st place all-time for consecutive games with at least 8 three-pointers made with 3.
 1st place all-time for games with at least 3 three-pointers made with 582.
 1st place all-time for games with at least 4 three-pointers made with 437.
 1st place all-time for games with at least 5 three-pointers made with 316.
 1st place all-time for games with at least 6 three-pointers made with 190.
 1st place all-time for games with at least 7 three-pointers made with 115.
 1st place all-time for games with at least 8 three-pointers made with 73.
 1st place all-time for games with at least 9 three-pointers made with 39.
 1st place all-time for games with at least 10 three-pointers made with 23.
 1st place all-time for games with at least 11 three-pointers made with 12.
 1st place all-time for most 50-point games after turning 30 years old with 7.
 Tied with Wilt Chamberlain.
 1st place all-time for most 50-point games with at least 7 three-pointers with 12.
 1st place all-time for most 50-point games with at least 8 three-pointers with 11.
 1st place all-time for most 50-point games with at least 9 three-pointers with 8.
 1st place all-time for most 50-point games with at least 10 three-pointers with 7.
 1st place all-time for most 50-point games with at least 11 three-pointers with 4.
 1st place all-time for most 50-point games with at most 7 free throws attempted with 4.
 1st place all-time for most 50-point games with at most 8 free throws attempted with 5.
 1st place all-time for most 50-point games with at most 9 free throws attempted with 6.
 1st place all-time for most 50-point games with at most 10 free throws attempted with 7.
 Tied with Wilt Chamberlain.
 1st place all-time for most 40-point games with at most 1 free throw attempted with 3.
 Tied with Klay Thompson.
 1st place all-time for most 40-point games with at most 2 free throws attempted with 6.
 1st place all-time for most 40-point games with at most 3 free throws attempted with 11.
 1st place all-time for most 40-point games with at most 4 free throws attempted with 17.
 1st place all-time for most 40-point games with at most 5 free throws attempted with 19.
 1st place all-time for most 40-point games with at most 6 free throws attempted with 24.
 1st place all-time for most 40-point games with at most 7 free throws attempted with 29.
 1st place all-time for most 40-point games with at most 8 free throws attempted with 38.
 1st place all-time for most 30-point games with at most 2 free throws attempted with 36.
 1st place all-time for most 30-point games with at most 3 free throws attempted with 63.
 1st place all-time for most 30-point games with at most 4 free throws attempted with 96.
 1st place all-time for most games with a 40+ scoring average, 5 made three pointers, and a 65+ field goal percentage with 13.
 1st place all-time for most seasons with at least 200 three-pointers made with 10.
 1st place all-time for most seasons with at least 300 three-pointers made with 4.
 1st place all-time for most seasons with at least 200 three-pointers made and 200 assists with 10.
 1st place all-time for most seasons with at least 200 three-pointers made and 300 assists with 9.
 2nd place all-time for most three-pointers made in a game with 13.
 Behind Klay Thompson.
 2nd place all-time for games with at least 12 three-pointers made with 2.
 Behind Klay Thompson.
 Fewest games played to reach 1,000 career three-pointers made with 369.
 Fewest games played to reach 2,000 career three-pointers made with 597.
 Fewest games played to reach 100 three-pointers made in a season with 19.
 Fewest games played to reach 150 three-pointers made in a season with 28.
 Only player in NBA history to make at least 10 three-pointers in consecutive games.
 Only player in NBA history to make at least 10 three-pointers seven times in one season.
 First player in NBA history to record 40+ points, 5+ made three-pointers, and a 65+ field goal percentage in consecutive games.
 First player in NBA history to record at least 50 points, 8 made three-pointers, and 6 assists in a game after turning 35 years old.
 First player in NBA history to reach 3,000 career three-pointers made.
 First player in NBA history to score 10,000 points entirely from three-pointers made.
 First player in NBA history to make at least 300 three-pointers in a season.
 Only player in NBA history to make at least 400 three-pointers in a season.
 Only player in NBA history with at least 400 three-pointers made and 500 assists in a season.
 Only player in NBA history with at least 300 three-pointers made and 500 assists in multiple seasons.
 Has achieved this in two seasons.
 Only player in NBA history with at least 250 three-pointers made and 500 assists in five seasons.
 Includes a streak of four consecutive seasons.
 Only player in NBA history with at least 200 three-pointers made and 600 assists in consecutive seasons.
 Only player in NBA history to join the 50–40–90 club and average at least 30 points in the same season.
 Only player in NBA history to record a season with a 30+ scoring average, 40+ three-point percentage, and 90+ free throw percentage.
 Has achieved this in three seasons.
 Only player in NBA history to record a 50-point game with at most 4 free throws attempted multiple times.
 Only player in NBA history to win the NBA MVP award unanimously.
 First player in NBA history to win the NBA Conference Finals MVP award, NBA All-Star Game MVP award, NBA Finals MVP award, and the NBA Championship in the same season.
 Only player in NBA history to win their first Three-Point Contest, NBA MVP award, and NBA Championship in the same season.
 Only player in NBA history to win the scoring title and make more three-pointers than free throws in the same season.
 Only player in NBA history to win the scoring title and lead the league in free throw percentage in the same season.
 Only player in NBA history to win the scoring title, lead the league in steals per game, and lead the league in free throw percentage in the same season.
 Only player in NBA history to lead the league in steals per game and free throw percentage in the same season.
 One of two players in NBA history to make 200 three-pointers in 6 consecutive seasons.
 Includes Klay Thompson.
 One of two players in NBA history to make 250 three-pointers and 600 assists in multiple seasons.
 Includes James Harden.
 One of two players in NBA history to record a 50-point game with at most 1 free throw attempted.
 Includes Jamal Murray.
 One of two players in NBA history to record a 50-point game with at most 3 free throws attempted.
 Tied with Klay Thompson.
 One of two players in NBA history to average 30 points per game and shoot 50% on field goals in multiple seasons as a guard.
 Includes Michael Jordan (achieved this five times)
 One of three players in NBA history to lead the league in points per game and steals per game in the same season.
 Includes Michael Jordan (achieved this three times) and Allen Iverson.
 One of five players in NBA history to score at least 50 points within the first three games of the season.
 Includes Wilt Chamberlain (achieved this four times), Michael Jordan (achieved this twice), Elgin Baylor, and Rashard Lewis.
 One of six players in NBA history to lead the league in free throw percentage in consecutive seasons.
 Includes Bill Sharman, Rick Barry, Larry Bird, Mark Price, and Reggie Miller.
 One of six players in NBA history to win four NBA Championships, two NBA MVP Awards, and an NBA Finals MVP Award in their careers.
 Includes Kareem Abdul-Jabbar, Tim Duncan, LeBron James, Magic Johnson, and Michael Jordan.
 One of six players in NBA history to win their first NBA MVP award and NBA Championship in the same season.
 Includes Shaquille O’Neal, Hakeem Olajuwon, Kareem Abdul-Jabbar, Willis Reed and Bob Cousy.
 One of seven players in NBA history to lead the league in free throw percentage at least three times.
 Includes Bill Sharman, Dolph Schayes, Rick Barry, Larry Bird, Mark Price, and Reggie Miller.
 One of thirteen players in NBA history to win consecutive NBA MVP Awards.
 Includes Bill Russell, Wilt Chamberlain, Kareem Abdul-Jabbar, Moses Malone, Larry Bird, Magic Johnson, Michael Jordan, Tim Duncan, Steve Nash, LeBron James, Giannis Antetokounmpo, and Nikola Jokić.
 Oldest Player to score at record 61 points in a game (scored 62): 32 years, 9 months 30 days.
 Oldest Player to score at record 30 points in two halves of the same game: 32 years, 9 months, 30 days.

Playoffs 
 1st place all-time for three-pointers made with 561.
 1st place all-time for three-pointers attempted with 1,400.
 1st place all-time for three-pointers made in a playoff season with 98.
 Tied with Klay Thompson.
 1st place all-time for most consecutive free throws made with 72.
 1st place all-time for most consecutive regular and playoff games with at least 1 three-pointer made with 233.
 1st place all-time for playoff games with at least 2 three-pointers made with 124.
 1st place all-time for playoff games with at least 3 three-pointers made with 106.
 1st place all-time for playoff games with at least 4 three-pointers made with 80.
 1st place all-time for playoff games with at least 5 three-pointers made with 58.
 1st place all-time for playoff games with at least 6 three-pointers made with 36.
 1st place all-time for playoff games with at least 7 three-pointers made with 18.
 1st place all-time for most consecutive playoff games with at least 1 three-pointer made with 132.
 1st place all-time for most consecutive playoff games with at least 2 three-pointers made with 27.
 1st place all-time for most consecutive playoff games with at least 3 three-pointers made with 14.
 1st place all-time for playoff games with at least 2 three-pointers made and 2 assists with 121.
 1st place all-time for playoff games with at least 3 three-pointers made and 3 assists with 96.
 1st place all-time for playoff games with at least 4 three-pointers made and 4 assists with 68.
 1st place all-time for playoff games with at least 5 three-pointers made and 5 assists with 40.
 1st place all-time for playoff games with at least 6 three-pointers made with 6 assists with 22.
 1st place all-time for playoff games with at least 7 three-pointers made with 7 assists with 11.
 Fewest games played in NBA history to reach 100 three-pointers made in a playoffs career with 28.
 Most points scored to complete a four-game sweep with 146.
 Most points scored during an overtime period in any regular or playoff game with 17.
 Most 3-point field goals made in a four-game series with 26.
 Most 3-point field goals attempted in a four-game series with 61.
 Most 3-point field goals attempted in a six-game series with 67.
 Most 3-point field goals attempted in a seven-game series with 80.
 Only player in NBA history to make 4 three-pointers in each of his first 3 career playoff games.
 Only player in NBA history to record 6 steals and make 6 three-pointers in a playoff game.
 Only player in NBA history to make 100% of free throw attempts while attempting at least 16 in a Game seven.
 One of two players in NBA history to achieve individual Triple-doubles in a playoff game as teammates.
 Includes Draymond Green.
 One of two players in NBA history to make 5 three-pointers in 6 straight playoff games.
 Includes Klay Thompson.
 One of four players in NBA history to record at least 25 points, 5 rebounds, 5 assists, and 5 steals in a playoff series clinching win.
 Includes Michael Jordan, Hersey Hawkins, and Scottie Pippen.

NBA Finals 
 Most three-pointers made in an NBA Finals career with 152.
 Most three-pointers attempted in an NBA Finals career with 365.
 Most three-pointers made in an NBA Finals game with 9.
 Most three-pointers attempted in an NBA Finals game with 17.
 Most three-pointers missed in a NBA Finals game with 13.
 Most three-pointers made in an NBA Finals series with 32.
 Most three-pointers attempted in an NBA Finals series with 80.
 Most three-pointers made in an NBA Finals four-game series with 22.
 Most three-pointers attempted in an NBA Finals four-game series with 53.
 Most three-pointers made in an NBA Finals five-game series with 19.
 Most three-pointers attempted in an NBA Finals five-game series with 49.
 Most three-pointers made in an NBA Finals six-game series with 31.
 Most three-pointers attempted in an NBA Finals six-game series with 71.
 Most three-pointers made in an NBA Finals seven-game series with 32.
 Most three-pointers attempted in an NBA Finals seven-game series with 80.
 1st place all-time for NBA Finals games with at least 2 three-pointers made with 32.
 1st place all-time for NBA Finals games with at least 3 three-pointers made with 27.
 1st place all-time for NBA Finals games with at least 4 three-pointers made with 22.
 1st place all-time for NBA Finals games with at least 5 three-pointers made with 17.
 1st place all-time for NBA Finals games with at least 6 three-pointers made with 12.
 1st place all-time for NBA Finals games with at least 7 three-pointers made with 7.
 Youngest player in NBA history to hold the NBA Finals career three-point record (minimum 40 made) at 30 yrs 80 days.
 Only player in NBA history to make at least 150 three-point field goals in the NBA Finals.
 Only player in NBA history to make at least 150 three-point field goals, 150 assists, and 150 free throws in the NBA Finals.
 One of two players in NBA history to achieve individual Triple-doubles in an NBA Finals game as opposing players.
 Includes LeBron James.

NBA All-Star

Career All-Star
 Most three-point field goals made in an NBA All-Star career with 47.

Game All-Star
 Most three-point field goals made in an NBA All-Star game with 16. 
 Most three-point field goals attempted in an NBA All-Star game with 27. 
 3rd place all-time for most points scored in an NBA All-Star game with 50.

NBA Three-Point Contest 
 Most points scored in a Three-Point Contest round with 31.
 Tied with Tyrese Haliburton.
 Most shots made (max 25) in a Three-Point Contest round with 21.
 Tied with Craig Hodges
 2nd place all-time for most points scored in a Three-Point Contest finals with 28.
 Behind Karl-Anthony Towns.
 2nd place all-time for most consecutive shots made (max 25) in a Three-Point Contest with 13.
 Behind Craig Hodges.
 Only player in NBA history to score at least 27 points in a Three-Point Contest round in three different events.
 Only player in NBA history to score at least 23 points in a Three-Point Contest final in four different events.
 Only player in NBA history to make at least 9 consecutive shots (max 25) in a Three-Point Contest in four different events.

Set with Klay Thompson 

 Most three-pointers made in a season by a duo with 678.
 Broke their own record of 525.
 Shared record for most three-pointers made in a playoff season with 98.
 Shared record for most consecutive seasons with at least 200 three-pointers made with 6.
 Most three-pointers attempted in a season by a duo with 1,536.
 Most three-pointers made in a playoff season by a duo with 178.
 Most three-pointers made in career finals by a duo with 148.
 Most games with 5 or more three-pointers made by a duo with 4.
 Only pair of teammates in NBA history to have a 3-pt FG in at least 30 straight games.
 Only pair of teammates in NBA history to make at least 150 combined three-pointers in consecutive playoff seasons.
 Only pair of teammates in NBA history to make at least 400 combined three-pointers in consecutive seasons.
 Have achieved this in four consecutive seasons.
 Only pair of teammates in NBA history to make at least 500 combined three-pointers in a season.
 Only pair of teammates in NBA history to make at least 500 combined three-pointers in consecutive seasons.
 Only pair of teammates in NBA history to make at least 600 combined three-pointers in a season.
 Only pair of teammates in activity to make at least 45 combined points in season average for 3 consecutive seasons.
 Only pair of teammates in NBA history to make at least 100 combined three-pointers in career finals.
 Only pair of teammates in NBA history to make at least 150 combined three-pointers in career finals.
 Only pair of teammates in NBA history to make at least 200 combined three-pointers in career finals.

Triple-Doubles

Explanatory notes

References

External links

 Stephen Curry at davidsonwildcats.com

Curry
Golden State Warriors